Onitsha Laquis Shaw (born July 16, 1980), who goes by the stage name Onitsha, is an American gospel musician. Her first album, Church Girl, was released by Stillwaters Records in 2007. This album was a Billboard magazine breakthrough release on the Gospel Albums chart.

Early life
Onitsha was born on July 16, 1980 in Los Angeles, California as Onitsha Laquis Shaw.

Music career
Onitsha first came on the scene as a soloist with the Mississippi Children's Choir singing lead on "I'm Blessed" from When God's Children Get Together. Her solo music recording career commenced in 2007, with the album, Church Girl, and it was released on April 17, 2007 by Stillwaters Records. This album was her breakthrough release upon the Billboard magazine charts, and it placed at No. 19 on the Gospel Albums chart. The album was reviewed positively by AllMusic and GOSPELflava, in addition, it got a nine out of ten review from Cross Rhythms.

In 2015, Onitsha sang background vocal in Janet Jackson's Unbreakable World Tour.

Discography

References

1980 births
Living people
African-American women songwriters
African-American Christians
Musicians from Los Angeles
Songwriters from California
Singers from California
21st-century African-American women singers